"On the Hop" is the tenth television play episode of the second season of the Australian anthology television series Australian Playhouse. "On the Hop" originally aired on ABC on 17 August 196725 September 1967 (Sydney) and was the first play from actor Michael Laurence.

Plot
Red Ruby, Queen of Wooloomooloo, retired after 15 years in the 'business' when she receives an unusual inheritance – but inheritances are not always what they seem.

Cast
 Shirley Cameron
 Carmen Duncan
 Kevin Manser
 Wendy Blacklock
 Lyn Lae
 Tom Farley
 Elizabeth Kirby

See also
 List of television plays broadcast on Australian Broadcasting Corporation (1960s)

References

External links
 
 

1967 television plays
1967 Australian television episodes
1960s Australian television plays
Australian Playhouse (season 2) episodes